is a Japanese animator, illustrator, and manga artist.

She contributed her character design for the series Shōnen Onmyōji and Saint Beast. Apart from illustrating for the novel series Shōnen Onmyōji, she also authors the manga, which acts as a gaiden for the main story which serializes in Kadokawa Shoten's Beans Ace.

Even so, it is not to be confused with Hinoko Seta who authors the manga adaptation of the series in Kadokawa Shoten's Monthly Asuka.

Works

Manga
Shōnen Onmyōji - serialized in Beans Ace

Artbooks
Sakura Asagi Illustration works: Saint Beast

Contributions

Character designs
Ashita ga Aru sa - Megumi Hayashibara

Aquarian Age Aquarian Age Calls Uō Uō! - Megami Magazine
Mobile Suit Gundam W Blind Target
Mobile Suit Gundam W Endless Waltz (Part 1 and Part 2)
Mobile Suit Gundam W Frozen Teardrop
Shōnen Onmyōji series
Saint Beast series

References

External links
 Sakura Asagi manga at Media Arts Database 

Living people
Anime character designers
Manga artists
Women manga artists
Japanese female comics artists
Year of birth missing (living people)